The Kapuni Branch, formerly known as the Opunake Branch, is a branch railway in North Island, New Zealand. It opened in 1924, and ran 36.4 km across the southern slopes of Mount Taranaki to link the rural town of Ōpunake with the Marton–New Plymouth Line at Te Roti. With the decline of rural freight, part of the line was closed in 1976, but the 10.9 km section to Kapuni was retained and upgraded to service traffic to the Kapuni natural gas field.

History
The branch line came about as a result of an election promise at the 1911 New Zealand general election. A branch line of "about 23 miles" to Ōpunake was authorised in 1912 for £400,000 by the Railways Authorization Act 1912. Work commenced in 1914, and earthworks reached Kapuni by 1916, but progress was slowed by World War I. Work was suspended in December 1917, and recommenced in March 1919. At the peak 200 men were employed on line works, including a large 1.6 km cutting near Waiteika. The Waingongoro Bridge near Te Roiti, an unusual (for New Zealand) brick arch bridge, was completed in 1921, and the second bridge in 1923.

The Public Works Department began running goods trains to Kapuni from 1 August 1923, and to Mangawhero Road by December 1924. The Ōpunake terminal was reached on 8 June 1925. On 12 July 1926 the Railways Department took over the line, with three goods trains each way a week plus passenger services.

A 9 km spur from Kapuni to Manaia was built in 1920–24, but track was only laid as far as a ballast pit on the Kaupokonui River, and the section as far as the ballast pit was closed and the track lifted by 1926.

Passenger services on the branch ended on 16 October 1955. DB class diesel locomotives were used from December 1966, then DC class diesel locomotives from the 1980s. In April 1976 it was decided to close the line beyond Kapuni from July, and the 10.9 km section to Kapuni was upgraded and renamed the Kapuni Branch.

Today the former 25.5 km section from Kapuni to Ōpunake has "plenty of railway remnants to satisfy the enthusiast" with sections of roadbed, cuttings, goods shed and loading bay at Pihama and a locomotive shed, gateposts, a platform and goods loading bank at Ōpunake.

See also
Marton-New Plymouth Line
Mount Egmont Branch
Stratford–Okahukura Line
Waitara Branch

References

Citations

Bibliography

 
 
 Hermann, Bruce J; North Island Branch Lines pp 49,50 (2007, New Zealand Railway & Locomotive Society, Wellington)

External links 
Article on opening of Opunake Branch, 1926

Railway lines in New Zealand
Rail transport in Taranaki
Railway lines opened in 1923
Railway lines closed in 1976
3 ft 6 in gauge railways in New Zealand
Closed railway lines in New Zealand
1923 establishments in New Zealand